The 2018 Mercyhurst Lakers football team will represent Mercyhurst University in 2018 Pennsylvania State Athletic Conference football season play.

Schedule

References

 

Mercyhurst
Mercyhurst Lakers football seasons
2018 in sports in Pennsylvania